The Chicago Cultural Center, opened in 1897, is a Chicago Landmark building operated by Chicago's Department of Cultural Affairs and Special Events that houses the city's official reception venue where the Mayor of Chicago has welcomed presidents and royalty, diplomats and community leaders. It is located in the Loop, across Michigan Avenue from Millennium Park.  Originally the central library building, it was converted in 1977 to an arts and culture center at the instigation of Commissioner of Cultural Affairs Lois Weisberg. The city's central library is now housed across the Loop in the spacious, postmodern Harold Washington Library Center opened in 1991.

As the nation's first free municipal cultural center, the Chicago Cultural Center is one of the city's most popular attractions and is considered one of the most comprehensive arts showcases in the United States. Each year, the Chicago Cultural Center features more than 1,000 programs and exhibitions covering a wide range of the performing, visual and literary arts. It also serves as headquarters for the Chicago Children's Choir. MB Real Estate provides events management for the center.

Architecture of the Chicago Cultural Center
The building was designed by Boston architectural firm Shepley, Rutan and Coolidge for the city's central library, and Grand Army of the Republic (GAR) meeting hall and memorial in 1892.  The land was donated by the GAR and the building was completed in 1897 at a cost of nearly $2 million (equivalent to $ million in ). It is organized as a 4-story north wing (77 East Randolph entrance) and a 5-story south wing (78 East Washington entrance), 104 feet tall, with  masonry walls faced with Bedford Blue Limestone on a granite base, and designed in a generally neoclassical style with Italian Renaissance elements. It is capped with two stained-glass domes, set symmetrically atop the two wings. Key points of architectural interest are as follows:

 Randolph Street entrance and stairway - Entrance with doric columns, mahogany doors, and entry hall with coffered ceiling and walls of green-veined Vermont marble. The curving stairway is faced with Knoxville pink marble, and features mosaics and ornate bronze balusters.
 Washington Street entrance, lobby, and grand staircase - Arched portal, bronze-framed doors, and a 3-story, vaulted lobby with walls of white Carrara marble and mosaics. The staircase is also of white Carrara marble, set with medallions of green marble from Connemara, Ireland, and intricate mosaics of Favrile glass, stone, and mother of pearl. The stairway to the 5th floor was inspired by Venice's Bridge of Sighs.
 Grand Army of the Republic Memorial - A large hall and rotunda in the north wing. The hall is faced with deep green Vermont marble, broken by a series of arches for windows and mahogany doors. The rotunda features 30-foot walls of Knoxville pink marble, mosaic floor, and a fine, stained-glass dome in Renaissance pattern by the firm of Healy and Millet.
 Sidney R. Yates Gallery - replica of an assembly hall in the Doge's Palace, Venice, with heavily ornamented pilasters and coffered ceiling.
 Preston Bradley Hall - A large, ornately patterned room of curving white Carrara marble, capped with an austere 38-foot Tiffany glass dome designed by artist J. A. Holzer. The Cultural Center states this to be the largest Tiffany dome in the world.

Renovation 
 The Chicago Cultural Center underwent an extensive renovation in 2021 - 2022 with the goal of unearthing the original beauty of the building.  The meticulous restoration of the art glass dome and decorative finishes in the Grand Army of the Republic rooms, a Civil War memorial, was made possible by a generous grant of services valued at over $15 million to the City of Chicago. The Chicago Cultural Center is home to two magnificent stained-glass domes.  Chicago-based Harboe Architects, a leading firm in historic preservation, was awarded the project.
 The scope of the project included recreating long-lost light fixtures, cleaning and polishing old marble, restoring mahogany doors, installation of new glass, and restoration teams performed many meticulous hours removing layers of paint in the historic rooms.  Also included in the scope was the complete restoration of the 40 foot diameter Tiffany-designed stained glass dome which had become covered in grime and paint.  The dome contained over 60,000 individual pieces of glass to be restored.  Daprato Rigali Studios of Chicago, IL performed the stained-glass dome restoration.

Past exhibitions

Crossroads: Modernism in Ukraine, 1910-1930 was a display of art by Ukrainian artists, such as Sukher Ber Rybak, Vsevolod Maskymovych, and Oleksandr Bohomazov to name a few.  Crossroads was organized by the Foundation for International Arts and Education with the National Art Museum of Ukraine.  It is presented by the Chicago Department of Cultural Affairs and the Kyiv Committee of the Chicago Sister Cities International Program.  The exhibition ran from July 22, 2006 - October 15, 2006.

Richard Hunt: Sixty Years of Sculpture was a major exhibition of sixty sculptures spanning Hunt's career. The exhibition drew primarily from his extensive “self-collection,” lent to the center for the show. This exhibition ran from December 6, 2014, through March 29, 2015

"Rush More" 
In 2017, Kerry James Marshall was commissioned to produce an inaugural mural entitled “Rush More”. Located on the west facade of the cultural center, the piece is an homage to women who have contributed to the culture of Chicago.

Portrayed are:

Washington painted the mural on a scale rendering of the building. The piece was then transposed to the actual façade by the muralist Jeff Zimmerman. Financing for the project was made possible by the non-profit, Murals of Acceptance and through philanthropic donations from David Arquette, Patricia Arquette, Marc Benioff, and Lynne Benioff.

See also 
 Chicago architecture
 List of museums and cultural institutions in Chicago

References

External links

 
High-resolution 360° Panoramas and Images of Chicago Cultural Center | Art Atlas

Buildings and structures in Chicago
Central Chicago
Cultural centers in Chicago
Organizations based in Chicago
Culture of Chicago
Cultural centers
Grand Army of the Republic buildings and structures
Chicago Landmarks
Government buildings completed in 1897
Buildings and structures on the National Register of Historic Places in Chicago
Former library buildings in the United States
Libraries on the National Register of Historic Places in Illinois
Tourist attractions in Chicago